Troy is a borough in Bradford County, Pennsylvania, United States. It is part of Northeastern Pennsylvania. The population was 1,354 at the 2010 census. Children residing in the borough are assigned to attend the Troy Area School District.

History
The borough of Troy was incorporated in 1845 from Troy Township, which encircles the borough.  Originally part of Luzerne County, the borough's future location (called Lansingburgh) became part of Ontario (now Bradford) County when it was created in 1810. The Troy Public High School and Van Dyne Civic Building are listed on the National Register of Historic Places.

Geography
Troy is located in western Bradford County at  (41.782180, -76.789561). It is surrounded by Troy Township but is separate from it. U.S. Route 6 passes through the borough, leading east  to Towanda, the county seat, and west  to Mansfield. Pennsylvania Route 14 turns south from US-6 in the center of Troy, leading  to Canton; the highway turns north from US-6 just east of Troy and leads  to Elmira, New York.

Demographics

At the 2010 census there were 1,354 people, 571 households, and 327 families residing in the borough. The population density was 1,923.2 people per square mile (746.5/km²). There were 617 housing units at an average density of 786.9 per square mile (305.4/km²). The racial makeup of the borough was 98.34% White, 0.27% African American, 0.13% Native American, 0.73% Asian, 0.27% from other races, and 0.27% from two or more races. Hispanic or Latino of any race were 0.66%.

There were 581 households, 26.2% had children under the age of 18 living with them, 43.0% were married couples living together, 10.3% had a female householder with no husband present, and 43.7% were non-families. 37.2% of households were made up of individuals, and 22.5% were one person aged 65 or older. The average household size was 2.30 and the average family size was 3.00.

In the borough the population was spread out, with 20.1% under the age of 18, 8.6% from 18 to 24, 28.6% from 25 to 44, 23.3% from 45 to 64, and 19.4% 65 or older. The median age was 41 years. For every 100 females there were 70.2 males. For every 100 females age 18 and over, there were 63.3 males.

The median household income was $27,426 and the median family income  was $41,667. Males had a median income of $30,625 versus $20,972 for females. The per capita income for the borough was $16,963. About 8.2% of families and 21.1% of the population were below the poverty line, including 13.0% of those under age 18 and 18.6% of those age 65 or over.

Notable people 
 Mary Canfield Ballard (1852–1927), poet and hymnwriter
 Pat Ballard (1899–1960), songwriter who composed "Mr. Sandman" and "(Oh Baby Mine) I Get So Lonely"
 Henry P. Davison (1867–1922), banker and first Chairman of the International League of Red Cross Societies
 Samuel M. Smead (1830–1898), newspaper editor and politician
 Ellen Oliver Van Fleet (1842-1893), poet and hymnwriter

References

External links
Troy Borough official website
Troy Area Chamber of Commerce

Populated places established in 1845
Boroughs in Bradford County, Pennsylvania
1845 establishments in Pennsylvania